Count Franciszek Wielopolski (died 1732) was a Polish noble (szlachcic).

He was the son of Deputy and Grand Chancellor Jan Wielopolski and Konstancja Krystyna Komorowska. He married Teresa Magdalena Tarło and in 1711 Anna Lubomirska, the daughter of Court Marshal and Hetman Hieronim Augustyn Lubomirski.

He was General starost of Kraków from 1688, Wielkorządca of Kraków from 1708, voivode of Sieradz Voivodship from 1720 and of Kraków Voivodship from 1728.

He was the starost of Bochnia, Żarnowiec, Lanckorona and Lipno.

17th-century births
1732 deaths
Secular senators of the Polish–Lithuanian Commonwealth
Mayors of Kraków
Ambassadors of Poland to Austria
Counts of Poland
Franciszek